Welcome Home is the 9th album by American singer-songwriter Carole King, released in 1978.

Track listing
All songs by Carole King except where noted.

"Main Street Saturday Night"
"Sunbird" (King, Rick Evers)
"Venusian Diamond" (King, Evers, Mark Hallman, Robert McEntee, Robb Galloway, Miguel Rivera, Richard Hardy, Michael Wooten)
"Changes"
"Morning Sun"
"Disco Tech" (King, Hallman, McEntee, Galloway, Rivera, Wooten, Hardy)
"Wings of Love" (King, Evers)
"Ride the Music"
"Everybody's Got the Spirit"
"Welcome Home"

Personnel
Carole King – vocals, background vocals, string arrangements
Robert McEntee – guitar, background vocals
Mark Hallman – guitars, background vocals
Rob Galloway – bass, background vocals
Michael Wooten – drums
Miguel Rivera – congas, percussion
Richard Hardy – flute, saxophone, clarinet, vocals
George Bohanon – trombone, horn arrangement
Dick Hyde – trombone
Ernie Watts – saxophone
Nolan Andrew Smith, Jr – trumpet, fluegelhorn
Oscar Brashear – trumpet, fluegelhorn
Charles Veal, Jr. – concertmaster, violin
Israel Baker – violin
Frank Foster – violin
William H. Henderson – violin
Marcia Van Dyke – violin
Dorothy Wade – violin
John Wittenberg – violin
Kenneth Yerke – violin
Rollice Dale – viola
Denyse Buffum – viola
Dennis Karmazyn – cello
Ronald Cooper – cello
The Trio on "Changes" was played by Charles Veal, Rollice Dale, Dennis Karmazyn
Bob Harrington – hammer dulcimer
Anne Golia – tamboura
Georgia Kelly – harp
Rick Evers – cowbell
Carole King, Mark Hallman, Robert McEntee, Richard Hardy, Stephanie Spruill, Alexandra Brown, Ann White – choir

Charts

References

External links
Carole King discography.

1978 albums
Carole King albums
Capitol Records albums